William Duckett may refer to:

William Duckett (Calne MP, died 1686) (c. 1624–1686), English gentleman, MP for Calne, 1659
William Duckett (Calne MP, died 1749) (1685–1749), British Army officer and Whig politician, MP for Calne, 1727–1741
William Duckett (United Irishman) (1768–1841), United Irishman
William Duckett (Canadian politician) (1825–1887), merchant and political figure in Quebec

See also